Joaquín Hernández García (born 1 February 1971) is a Mexican former footballer who played as a midfielder.

Career
Hernández played as a midfielder during his career, and was a member of the Mexico national football team that competed at the 1992 Summer Olympics in Barcelona, Spain. He earned two caps for the national A-side, making his debut on October 22, 1992, in a friendly match against Croatia.

International appearances

References

FIFA

1971 births
Living people
Mexico international footballers
Association football midfielders
Olympic footballers of Mexico
Footballers at the 1992 Summer Olympics
Tigres UANL footballers
Club Puebla players
Dorados de Sinaloa footballers
Chiapas F.C. footballers
Liga MX players
Club América footballers
Footballers from Tlaxcala
Mexican footballers
Medalists at the 1991 Pan American Games
Pan American Games silver medalists for Mexico
Pan American Games medalists in football
Footballers at the 1991 Pan American Games